Zapp III is the third studio album by the American funk band Zapp. It was released on July 25, 1983, by Warner Bros. Records.

In popular culture
"I Can Make You Dance" is featured on the fictional radio station Bounce FM in the video game Grand Theft Auto: San Andreas. "Heartbreaker" is featured on the radio station Space 103.2 in Grand Theft Auto V, and was also featured in the 1995 film Friday.

Track listing

References

1983 albums
Albums produced by Roger Troutman
Warner Records albums
Zapp (band) albums